Les Prés-d'Orvin is a small all year round resort, above Orvin, Bernese Jura, Switzerland and Biel/Bienne, at about 1050 meters of altitude, located in between the second and third Jura Mountains range, which peaks at Chasseral.

Tourist attractions in the Canton of Bern
Ski areas and resorts in Switzerland